The Atalaye nesophontes (Nesophontes hypomicrus) is an extinct species of mammal in the family Nesophontidae. It was endemic to Hispaniola in the Caribbean (in both Haiti and the Dominican Republic), and is only known from fossil deposits.

References

Nesophontes
Holocene extinctions
Extinct animals of Haiti
Extinct animals of the Dominican Republic
Mammals of the Dominican Republic
Mammals of Haiti
Mammals of Hispaniola
Mammals of the Caribbean
Mammals described in 1929
Taxonomy articles created by Polbot
Mammal extinctions since 1500